Gentile Bellini (c. 1429 – 23 February 1507) was an Italian painter of the school of Venice. He came from Venice's leading family of painters, and at least in the early part of his career was more highly regarded than his younger brother Giovanni Bellini, the reverse of the case today. From 1474 he was the official portrait artist for the Doges of Venice, and as well as his portraits he painted a number of very large subjects with multitudes of figures, especially for the Scuole Grandi of Venice, wealthy confraternities that were very important in Venetian patrician social life.

In 1479 he was sent to Constantinople by the Venetian government when the Ottoman Sultan Mehmed II requested an artist; he returned the next year.  Thereafter a number of his subjects were set in the East, and he is one of the founders of the Orientalist tradition in Western painting.  His portrait of the Sultan was also copied in paintings and prints and became known all over Europe.

Biography

Gentile was born into the leading family of painters in Venice.  His father Jacopo Bellini, was a Venetian pioneer in the use of oil paint as an artistic medium; his brother was Giovanni Bellini, and his brother-in-law Andrea Mantegna. He was christened Gentile after Jacopo's master, Gentile da Fabriano.  Gentile was taught painting in the workshop of his father. Although today Gentile is often seen in the shadow of his more famous family members, in his own time he was considered among the greatest living painters in Venice and had no shortage of commissions; his talent as a portraitist revealed itself at an early age.

Paintings

Gentile's earliest signed work is The Blessed Lorenzo Giustinian (1445), one of the oldest surviving oil paintings in Venice (now at the Accademia Museum). During the 1450s Bellini worked on a commission for the Scuola Grande di San Marco and painted in conjunction with his brother, Giovanni Bellini. From 1454 he was also the official portrait artist for the Doges of Venice, (for example, see image of the Doge Giovanni Mocenigo at right).

Much of Gentile Bellini's surviving work consists of very large paintings for public buildings, including those for the Scuola Grande di San Giovanni Evangelista. Along with Lazzaro Bastiani, Vittore Carpaccio, Giovanni Mansueti and Benedetto Rusconi, Bellini was one of the artists of hired to paint the 10-painting narrative cycle known as The Miracles of the Relic of the Cross. The commission was intended to celebrate the relic of the Holy Cross which the confraternity had received in 1369. Gentile's contributions  include the Procession of the True Cross in Piazza San Marco, which dates from 1496, and the Miracle of the True Cross at the S. Lorenzo Bridge, dating from 1500 and featuring Gentile's self-portrait and that of his brother Giovanni.

Bellini and the East 
Venice was, at that time, a very important point in which cultures and trade bordered on the eastern Mediterranean Sea and provided gateways to Asia and Africa. As noted, in his lifetime, Gentile was the most prestigious painter in Venice. Therefore, in 1479, he was chosen by the government of Venice to work for Sultan Mehmed II in Constantinople. However, in addition to his work at the Ottoman Court, Gentile's work also responded to other aspects of the East, including the Byzantine Empire.

Istanbul

In September 1479 Gentile was sent by the Venetian Senate to the new Ottoman capital Istanbul as part of the peace settlement between Venice and the Turks. His role was not only as a visiting painter in an exotic locale, but also as a cultural ambassador for Venice.  This was important to Mehmed II, as he was particularly interested in the art and culture of Italy, and he attempted on several occasions to have himself portrayed by Italian artists. He finally reached his goal with Gentile, who is believed to have painted the portrait of Mehmed II now in the National Gallery, London, (but largely overpainted).

Subsequently, an Oriental flavour appears in several of his paintings, including the portrait of a Turkish artist and St. Mark Preaching at Alexandria (above). The last was completed by his brother, Giovanni Bellini.

According to Carlo Ridolfi (who was born 87 years after Bellini's death) in his 1648 history of the Venetian painters:Bellini made a painting of the head of John the Baptist on a charger, the saint being revered by the Turks as a prophet. When the picture was brought before the Sultan, he praised the skill exhibited there, but drew Gentile's attention nonetheless to an error, which was that the neck stretched out too far from the head, and as it appeared to him that Gentile appeared unconvinced, to enable him to see the natural effect, he had a slave brought to him and had his head chopped off, demonstrating to him how, once separated from the chest, the neck contracted. Gentile, fearful at such barbarities, immediately tried in every way to be released from his contract in case one day he himself should be the victim of such a joke.This anecdote is likely apocryphal, as a similar story had been told by Seneca of Parrhasius, as well as of Michelangelo via a dubious source.

Greece

Gentile responded to other aspects of the East, including the Byzantine Greek Empire, as well as Venice's other trading partners in North Africa and Levant. Venice had a long-established relationship with the Eastern Mediterranean. Saint Mark, Venice's patron, was from the Egyptian city of Alexandria, and Venice's cultural and spiritual centre – the basilica of San Marco – was built in his honor (and as his mausoleum) in the Greek Byzantine style. Although Constantinople fell to the Ottoman Turks in 1453, the Greek Byzantine world had a continuing impact upon Venetian art and culture as a number of Greek Christians fled Muslim rule. It was here that Gentile painted the portrait of Queen Caterina Cornaro of Cyprus (at right). This is counted as the second known portrait including the queen, which is now in the collection of the Szepmuveszeti Museum in Budapest.

Retirement years and legacy
Bellini's most important paintings, the monumental canvases in the Doge's Palace in Venice, were destroyed by fire in 1577. Only a few of his other works remain, namely the large narrative paintings The Procession in Piazza San Marco (above left) and The Preaching of Saint Mark in Alexandria (above right), produced in his final years. Little remains of Gentile's art from the 1470s and 1480s, except for the works made in Constantinople. Moreover, many workshop paintings and drawings have been assigned to Gentile Bellini. This has had the unfortunate consequence of confirming his reputation as an awkward artist, especially in comparison with his beloved brother Giovanni. Gentile's fall from popular favor seems to have begun shortly after his death; by 1557 Lodovico Dolce made a rather acerbic comment about him as an early teacher of Titian:

He was interred in the Basilica di San Giovanni e Paolo, a traditional burial place of the doges.

In recent years, Gentile has once again generated interest, especially in a recent spate of scholarly publications and exhibitions on the subject of cross-cultural exchange between Europe and the Levant.

Selected works
Madonna Enthroned with Child (1475–1485) - National Gallery, London
Portrait of Doge Giovanni Mocenigo (1478–1485) - Museo Correr, Venice
Procession in St. Mark's Square (1496) - Gallerie dell'Accademia, Venice
Miracle of the True Cross at the Bridge of S. Lorenzo (1500) - Gallerie dell'Accademia, Venice
Miracle of the Reliquary of the Cross (1500)
St. Mark Preaching in Alexandria (1504–1507) - Pinacoteca di Brera, Milan
Man with a Pair of Dividers
St. Dominic
Mehmet the Conqueror
Portrait of Caterina Cornaro, Queen of Cyprus - Szépmüvészeti Múzeum, Budapest
The Annunciation, Thyssen-Bornemisza Museum, Madrid, Spain.

Notes

References
Hartt, Frederick, History of Italian Renaissance Art, (2nd edn.)1987, Thames & Hudson (US Harry N Abrams),

See also
 List of Orientalist artists
 Orientalism

External links
 Gentile Bellini in "A World History of Art"
 Gentile Bellini and the East exhibition

1420s births
1507 deaths
15th-century Venetian people
16th-century Venetian people
15th-century Italian painters
16th-century Italian painters
Italian male painters
Italian medallists
Italian Renaissance painters
German orientalists
Orientalist painters
Quattrocento painters
Painters from Venice
Sibling artists
Burials at Santi Giovanni e Paolo, Venice